The men's light heavyweight competition Judo at the 2015 Summer Universiade in Gwangju was held on 5 July at the Yeomju Bitgoeul Gymnasium.

Schedule
All times are Korea Standard Time (UTC+09:00)

Results

Main bracket

Final

Top half

Bottom half

Repechage

References

External links
 
 Official website

M100
Universiade